Golanik-e Sofla (also Romanized as Golānīk-e Soflá; also known as Golānīk-e Pā’īn and Kalānīk-e Pā'īn) is a village in Anzal-e Jonubi Rural District, Anzal District, Urmia County, West Azerbaijan Province, Iran. At the 2006 census, its population was 129, in 26 families.

References 

Populated places in Urmia County